A national vote of confidence in President Abulfaz Elchibey was held in Azerbaijan on 29 August 1993, following a coup d'état in June. Voters were asked "Do you trust the President of the Azerbaijan Republic?" Only 2% of voters voted "yes", with turnout reported to be 92%. Elchibey was formally removed from office on 1 September.

Results

References

Azerbaijan
Vote
Referendums in Azerbaijan